Ghost Stories is a one-act horror play written by Jeremy Dyson and Andy Nyman.

Production 
The play was conceived after Nyman walked past the theatre which had hosted The Woman in Black for over 30 years, and he realised there hadn't been a horror play produced since that time. He contacted his childhood friend Jeremy Dyson with the idea of a new horror play like The Vagina Monologues, with three narrators on stage telling ghost stories. The two were commissioned by Sean Holmes, the newly appointed artistic director the Lyric Hammersmith theatre in London, to write the play.

It premiered at the Liverpool Playhouse in February 2010 before being transferred for a longer run at the Lyric Hammersmith in London. It then transferred to the Duke of York's Theatre in the West End where it played from June 2010 to July 2011. The show re-opened at the Arts Theatre in February 2014 and ran until March 2015. In 2015, the show was produced at the Sydney Opera House before going on an Australian National Tour concluding at the State Theatre Centre of Western Australia in October 2016. The play was also performed in Canada (2011), Russia (2012), Peru (2015), China (2018), Finland (2018) and The Netherlands (2019).

In April 2019, the original creative team came together again to stage the production for an extended run at the Lyric Hammersmith, marking the end of co-director Holmes' tenure at the theatre. The production transferred to the Ambassadors Theatre form 4 October to 4 January 2020 before embarking on a UK tour from January 2020 at The Alexandra, Birmingham. On 27 March 2020 it was announced the remainder of the tour had been cancelled due to the COVID-19 pandemic.

In 2019, the playtext was published by Nick Hern Books.

The play is notable for running only 80 minutes (with no interval) and for its publicized warnings advising against anyone under the age of 15 attending. The marketing of the show outside the theatre is unusual in that there are no production photographs, just stills and video monitors showing the shocked reactions of audience members. An announcement at the end of the play asks the audience to "keep the secrets of Ghost Stories" so that new audiences do not have the experience spoiled with any prior information about the play.

Plot
Reviews of the show have confined themselves to outlining the basic structure of the plot, which revolves around Dr. Goodman, a Professor of Parapsychology (Andy Nyman) delivering a lecture on ghost stories. In the lecture, he discusses a website featuring ghostly pictures, scienceofghosts.com. He has recorded interviews with three people who claim to have had a supernatural experience. Each story seems to hinge on guilty feelings. As each interview is played back, the story is re-enacted on stage. The stories are recounted by a night watchman, a teen driver and a businessman awaiting his first child. These stories are then drawn together at the end, with a twist, as it becomes clear that the Professor is a participant in the stories and not simply a narrator.

Critical reception 
Reviewing the 2010 production, The Guardian called the stories "as substantial and troubling as the fake ectoplasm manifested by a dodgy medium" while, in the same newspaper, a real-life psychic ghost hunter was quoted as saying the play "was refreshing, and made me jump, several times."  After revisiting the play in 2019, the newspaper concluded it had become more elegant over the years, but remained "more playful than petrifying." Time Out called the play a "harrowing, 80-minute nightmare thrill."

Notable productions

West End and UK productions 
The casts and creative teams for the original runs en UK revivals of the play were:

Original Australian production

The cast and creative team for the original Australian tour of the play were:

Film adaptation 
A film adaptation premiered in 2017, starring Nyman in a reprisal of his role as Professor Philip Goodman, Paul Whitehouse as the night watchman, Alex Lawther as the student, and Martin Freeman as the businessman.

References

External links
  Trailer, 17 March 2010

British plays
Horror plays
Ghosts in written fiction
2010 plays